The 2007–08 season was Brighton & Hove Albion's 106th year in existence and second consecutive season in League One. Along with competing in League One, the club also participated in the FA Cup and the League Cup.
The Seagulls finished 7th in League One, missing out on the promotion play-offs by seven points. As a result, manager Dean Wilkins was replaced by Micky Adams at the end of the season, and left the club after being offered a role as first-team coach.

First Team Squad

Competitions

League One

Results

FA Cup

Brighton & Hove Albion were knocked out of the FA Cup in the third round with a home defeat to League Two outfit Mansfield Town.

Football League Cup

Brighton & Hove Albion were knocked out of the Football League Cup in the first round by Championship side Cardiff City.

Football League Trophy

Brighton & Hove Albion received a bye to the Southern area second round and were drawn at home to League Two side Barnet. They were knocked out in the Southern area semi-final by League One champions Swansea City

Transfers

Transfers in

Loans in

Transfers out

Loans out

References

2007-08
Brighton & Hove Albion F.C.